"Pray" is a song by Christian rock band Sanctus Real from their sixth studio album, Run. It was released on April 30, 2013, as the second single from the album. This was the song used for the National Day of Prayer campaign.

Composition 
"Pray" was written by Matt Hammitt, Chris Rohman and Christopher Stevens.

Release 
The song "Pray" was digitally released as the lead single from Run on April 30, 2013.

Charts

Weekly charts

Year-end charts

References 

2013 singles
Sanctus Real songs
Songs written by Christopher Stevens (musician)
2013 songs
Sparrow Records singles
Songs written by Matt Hammitt